Nikola Radović (10 March 1933 – 28 January 1991) was a Montenegrin footballer.

Club career
Radović began his career at Budućnost Titograd before moving to BSK Belgrade where he started to play professionally in 1952. After two seasons with BSK, with whom he won the 1953 Yugoslav Cup, he joined Hajduk Split where he spent the bulk of his career. He appeared in a total of 95 Yugoslav First League matches and scored 9 goals for Hajduk in the period from 1954 to 1960 and helped the club win the 1954–55 championship title.

International career
He was a member of Yugoslavia squads at the 1956 Summer Olympics and the 1958 FIFA World Cup and earned three caps for the team, all in 1956 (he appeared twice at the 1956 Olympics). His final international was a December 1956 friendly match against Indonesia.

References

External links
 
 
 Nikola Radović at the Serbia national football team website 

1933 births
1991 deaths
Footballers from Podgorica
Association football defenders
Yugoslav footballers
Yugoslavia international footballers
Footballers at the 1956 Summer Olympics
Medalists at the 1956 Summer Olympics
1958 FIFA World Cup players
Olympic footballers of Yugoslavia
Olympic silver medalists for Yugoslavia
Olympic medalists in football
FK Budućnost Podgorica players
OFK Beograd players
HNK Hajduk Split players
Yugoslav First League players